Edward Charles Morice Fox  (born 13 April 1937) is an English actor.

He starred in the film The Day of the Jackal (1973), playing the part of a professional assassin, known only as the "Jackal", who is hired to assassinate the French president Charles de Gaulle in the summer of 1963. Fox is also known for his roles in Battle of Britain (1969), The Go-Between (1971), for which he won a BAFTA award, and The Bounty (1984). He also collaborated with director Richard Attenborough, appearing in his films Oh! What a Lovely War (1969), A Bridge Too Far (1977) and Gandhi (1982).

He portrayed Edward VIII in the British television drama series Edward & Mrs. Simpson (1978) and appeared in the historical series Taboo (2017). In addition to film and television work, Fox has received acclaim as a stage actor.

Early life and education

Fox was born the first of three sons on 13 April 1937 in Chelsea, London, the son of Robin Fox, a theatrical agent, and Angela Muriel Darita Worthington, an actress and writer. He is the father of actors Emilia Fox and Freddie Fox, the elder brother of actor James Fox and film producer Robert Fox, and an uncle of actor Laurence Fox. His paternal great-grandfather was industrialist and inventor Samson Fox, and his paternal grandmother was Hilda Hanbury, sister of stage performer Lily Hanbury. His maternal grandfather was dramatist Frederick Lonsdale, and his maternal grandmother was the daughter of football player and stockbroker Charles Morice. Fox was educated at Harrow School and completed his National Service in the Loyals, having failed to gain a commission in the Coldstream Guards.

Career
Fox made his theatrical debut in 1958, and his first film appearance was as an extra in The Loneliness of the Long Distance Runner (1962). He also had a non-speaking part as a waiter in This Sporting Life (1963). Throughout the 1960s he worked mostly on stage, including a turn as Hamlet. In the late 1960s and early 1970s he established himself with roles in major British films, including Oh! What a Lovely War (1969), Battle of Britain (1969) and The Go-Between (1971). In The Go-Between, he played the part of Lord Hugh Trimingham, for which he won a BAFTA award for Best Supporting Actor. His acting ability also brought him to the attention of director Fred Zinnemann, who was looking for an actor who was not well-known and could be believable as the assassin in the film The Day of the Jackal (1973). Fox won the role, beating other contenders such as Roger Moore and Michael Caine.

From then on he was much sought after, appearing in such films as A Bridge Too Far (1977) as Lieutenant General Horrocks, a role he has cited as a personal favourite, and for which he won the Best Supporting Actor award at the British Academy Film Awards. He also starred in Force 10 from Navarone (1978), with Robert Shaw and Harrison Ford.

In 1990, he appeared as a contestant on Cluedo, facing off against fellow actor Joanna David.

He portrayed King Edward VIII in the television drama Edward & Mrs. Simpson (1978). In the film Gandhi (1982), Fox portrayed Brigadier-General Reginald Dyer, who was responsible for the Amritsar massacre in India. He then appeared as M in the unofficial Bond film Never Say Never Again (1983), a remake of Thunderball (1965). He also appeared in The Bounty (1984) and Wild Geese II (1985), both opposite Laurence Olivier, and in The Importance of Being Earnest (2002), Nicholas Nickleby (2002), and Stage Beauty (2004).

Later stage work
Fox has consolidated his reputation with regular appearances on stage in London's West End. He was seen in Four Quartets, a set of four poems by T. S. Eliot, accompanied by the keyboard music of Johann Sebastian Bach, performed by Christine Croshaw. In 2010, Fox performed a one-man show, An Evening with Anthony Trollope, directed by Richard Digby Day. In 2013, he replaced Robert Hardy in the role of Winston Churchill in the premiere of The Audience, after Hardy had to withdraw for health reasons. In 2018, he appeared with his son Freddie Fox in an adaption of Oscar Wilde's An Ideal Husband.

Awards
For his role as Viscount Trimingham in The Go-Between (1971), he won the Best Supporting Actor Award at the following year's British Academy Film Awards.

He won the Best Supporting Actor Award at the British Academy Film Awards a second time for his role as Lieutenant General Horrocks in A Bridge Too Far (1977).

Honours
Fox was appointed an Officer of the Order of the British Empire for his services to Drama in the 2003 New Year Honours.

Personal life
From 1958 until their 1961 divorce, Fox was married to actress Tracy Reed with whom he has a daughter, Lucy Arabella (born 1960), who became the Viscountess Gormanston upon her marriage to Nicholas Preston, Viscount Gormanston. In 1971, he began a relationship with actress Joanna David; they married in July 2004. They have two children together, actors Emilia (born 1974) and Frederick "Freddie" (born 1989).

He has two grandchildren through his daughters: Harry Grenfell from Lucy's marriage to David Grenfell, and Rose Gilley from Emilia's relationship with actor Jeremy Gilley.

Fox has residences in London and Wareham, Dorset.

Views and advocacy
Fox spoke at the conference for the Referendum Party ahead of the 1997 general election and was a friend of its leader James Goldsmith. He has also been a patron of the UK Independence Party.

In 2002, Fox joined the Countryside March to support hunting rights in the UK. He supported the restoration of the Royal Hall, Harrogate, funded by his great-grandfather Samson Fox.

In 2010, Fox gave his support to a local campaign to prevent a supermarket being built close to his home in Dorset, citing the impact it would have upon small and independent businesses in the area. He chronicled the events in an article for The Daily Telegraph.

Fox also endorsed the successful "Leave" vote campaign ahead of the referendum to leave the European Union.

Filmography

 1962 The Loneliness of the Long Distance Runner as Minor Role (uncredited)
 1963 This Sporting Life as Restaurant Barman (uncredited)
 1963 The Mind Benders as Stewart (uncredited)
 1965 Life at the Top as Office Supervisor (uncredited)
 1966 The Frozen Dead as Norbugh's Brother (Prisoner #3)
 1967 The Jokers as Lieutenant Sprague
 1967 The Naked Runner as Ritchie Jackson
 1967 The Long Duel as Hardwicke
 1967 I'll Never Forget What's'isname as Waiter
 1967 Man in a Suitcase (TV, Episode "Castle in the Clouds") as Ezard
 1968 Journey to Midnight as Sir Robert Sawyer (segment "Poor Butterfly")
 1968 The Portrait of a Lady (TV series) as Lord Warburton 
 1969 Oh! What a Lovely War as Aide to Field-Marshal Haig
 1969 Battle of Britain as Pilot Officer Archie
 1970 Skullduggery as Bruce Spofford
 1970 The Breaking of Bumbo as Horwood
 1971 The Go-Between as Hugh Trimingham
 1973 The Day of the Jackal as The Jackal 
 1973 A Doll's House as Nils Krogstad
 1974 Doctor Watson and the Darkwater Hall Mystery as Dr. Watson
 1975 Galileo as Cardinal Inquisitor
 1977 The Squeeze as Foreman
 1977 The Duellists as Colonel
 1977 A Bridge Too Far as Lieutenant General Brian Horrocks
 1977 Soldaat van Oranje as Colonel Rafelli
 1978 The Big Sleep as Joe Brody
 1978 Force 10 from Navarone as Sergeant John Miller
 1978 Edward & Mrs. Simpson (TV miniseries) as King Edward VIII
 1979 The Cat and the Canary as Hendricks
 1980 The Mirror Crack'd as Inspector Craddock
 1981 Nighthawks as ATAC Man #2
 1982 Gandhi as Brigadier General Reginald Dyer
 1983 Never Say Never Again as M
 1983 The Dresser as Oxenby
 1984 The Bounty as Captain Greetham
 1985 The Shooting Party as Lord Gilbert Hartlip
 1985 Wild Geese II as Alex Faulkner
 1986 Shaka Zulu (TV) as Lieutenant Francis Farewell
 1986 Anastasia: The Mystery of Anna (TV) as Dr. Hauser
 1987 A Hazard of Hearts (TV film) as Lord Harry Wrothman
 1987 Quartermaine's Terms (TV) as St. John Quartermaine
 1989 Return from the River Kwai as Major Benford
 1991 Robin Hood as Prince John
 1991 The Strauss Dynasty as Prince of Metternich
 1993 The Maitlands (TV) as Major Harry Luddington
 1994 A Feast at Midnight as Father
 1994 Sherwood's Travels as Donen
 1995 A Month by the Lake as Major Wilshaw
 1995 Wild Discovery as Narrator
 1996 Gulliver's Travels (TV) as General Limtoc
 1996 September (TV film) as Archie
 1997 Prince Valiant as King Arthur
 1997 A Dance to the Music of Time as Uncle Giles
 1998 Lost in Space as Businessman
 2001 All the Queen's Men as Aitken
 2002 The Importance of Being Earnest as Lane
 2002 Foyle's War as Assistant Commissioner Summers
 2002 Daniel Deronda (TV) as Sir Hugo Mallinger
 2002 Nicholas Nickleby as Sir Mulberry Hawk
 2003 The Republic of Love as Richard
 2004 Stage Beauty as Sir Edward Hyde
 2004 Poirot: The Hollow (TV) as Gudgeon
 2005 Lassie as Colonel Hulton
 2007 Oliver Twist (TV) as Mr. Brownlow
 2010 Marple: The Secret of Chimneys (TV) as Lord Caterham
 2011 Midsomer Murders: "Dark Secrets" (TV) as William Bingham
 2013 Lewis: "Intelligent Design" (TV) as Dr. Yardley
 2013 National Theatre Live: The Audience as Winston Churchill
 2014 Katherine of Alexandria as Emperor Constantius
 2015 The Dresser (TV) as Thornton
 2017 Taboo (TV) as Horace Delaney (Deceased)
 2018 Johnny English Strikes Again as Agent Nine

Selected theatre performances
 Harry, Lord Monchensey in The Family Reunion by T S Eliot. Directed by Michael Elliott at the Royal Exchange, Manchester. 1979)
 Captain in The Dance of Death by August Strindberg. Directed by Kenneth MacMillan at the Royal Exchange, Manchester. (1983)
 Crichton in The Admirable Crichton by J.M.Barrie at the Theatre Royal, Haymarket, London. (1989)

Other projects and contributions
When Love Speaks (2002, EMI Classics) – William Shakespeare's "Sonnet 140" ("Be wise as thou art cruel; do not press"), a compilation album that features interpretations of Shakespeare's sonnets and excerpts from his plays by famous actors and musicians.

References

External links

1937 births
Living people
20th-century English male actors
21st-century English male actors
Alumni of RADA
Best Actor BAFTA Award (television) winners
Best Supporting Actor BAFTA Award winners
English male film actors
English male stage actors
English male television actors
Loyal Regiment officers
Male actors from London
Officers of the Order of the British Empire
People educated at Harrow School
Military personnel from London
People from Chelsea, London
Robin Fox family